Un Besito Más (One More Kiss) is the fourth studio album released by Jesse & Joy on December 4, 2015. Its lead single, "Ecos de Amor", was released on August 14, 2015. "Ecos de Amor" is also featured in the Mexican telenovela Pasión y Poder.

At the 17th Annual Latin Grammy Awards, the album received a nomination for Album of the Year and won for Best Contemporary Pop Vocal Album and "Ecos de Amor" was nominated for Song of the Year and Record of the Year. Un Besito Mas also won a Grammy Award for Best Latin Pop Album and was nominated for a Lo Nuestro Award for Pop Album of the Year.

Track listing

Charts

Weekly charts

Year-end charts

Certifications

Awards and nominations

References

2015 albums
Jesse & Joy albums
Latin Grammy Award for Best Contemporary Pop Vocal Album
Spanish-language albums
Warner Music Mexico albums
Grammy Award for Best Latin Pop Album